Karel John van den Brandeler (13 March 1888 – 11 December 1948) was a Dutch modern pentathlete and fencer. He competed at the 1924 and 1928 Summer Olympics.

References

External links
 

1888 births
1948 deaths
Dutch male fencers
Dutch male modern pentathletes
Olympic fencers of the Netherlands
Olympic modern pentathletes of the Netherlands
Modern pentathletes at the 1924 Summer Olympics
Fencers at the 1928 Summer Olympics
Sportspeople from The Hague
20th-century Dutch people